The Scandinavia Philatelic Society was founded in the United Kingdom in 1952 as the Scandinavian Collectors Club, to promote the collection of Stamps, Postcards and Postal History of greater Scandinavia.  That is Denmark, Finland, Norway, Sweden, Iceland, Greenland, Faroe Islands, Danish West Indies, Åland and Spitsbergen.

Meetings
The Society holds regular meetings in the United Kingdom throughout the year and an AGM weekend, usually in the spring. These are informal events, visitors are welcome and dates are published on the website.

Philatelic exhibitions
Members also exhibit at national exhibitions in Britain and international philatelic exhibitions around the world. The Society also attends exhibitions to promote Scandinavian philately, and new members are always welcome.

Scandinavia contact
Scandinavia Philatelic Society publishes a magazine, Scandinavian Contact quarterly, with news, research and other articles for its members.

Services
In addition, there are auctions of Scandinavian philatelic items. A packet service makes it possible for members to increase the size of their collections on an approval basis, paying for material bought and sending the rest on to the next member on the list. A number of such circuits exist, within the organization, catering for different interests and price brackets. Both stamps and Postal History are included.

The Society owns an extensive library from which members can borrow material for research purposes. A number of research publications relating to Scandinavian Mail have been published through the Society. Recent books include Spitzbergen Cruise Mail 1890 - 1914 and Finnish Fieldpost 1939 - 1945, both are available through the website.

See also
 Scandinavian Collectors Club
 Stamp collecting
 Swedish Philatelic Federation

External links
 http://www.scandps.org.uk/publications
 http://www.scandps.org.uk/
 http://website.lineone.net/~polar.publishing/stampclub.htm
 http://www.london2010.org.uk/

Organizations established in 1952
Philatelic organisations based in the United Kingdom
Philately of Greenland
Philately of Finland
Philately of Denmark
Philately of Sweden
Philately of Norway
Philately of the Faroe Islands
Philately of Iceland
1952 establishments in the United Kingdom